The Military Cooperation with Civilian Law Enforcement Agencies Act is a United States federal law enacted in 1981 that allows the United States Armed Forces to cooperate with domestic and foreign law enforcement agencies. Operations in support of law enforcement include assistance in counterdrug operations, assistance for civil disturbances, special security operations, counter-terrorism, explosive ordnance disposal (EOD), and similar activities. Constitutional and statutory restrictions and corresponding directives and regulations limit the type of support provided in this area. The legislation allows the U.S. military to give law enforcement agencies access to its military bases and its military equipment. The legislation was promoted during the Presidency of Ronald Reagan in the context of the War on drugs, and is considered a part of a general trend towards the militarization of police.

The Act was known as Public Law 97-86 and is codified at title 10 of the United States Code, Chapter 18.

See also
 Aviation Drug-Trafficking Control Act of 1984
 Militarization of police
 Posse Comitatus Act

References

External links
 Information about the Act from fas.org
 Text of the law
 Law in PDF
 
 

1981 in law
United States federal defense and national security legislation
United States federal criminal legislation